Cascade Falls may refer to:

Canada
Cascade Falls (Iskut River), a waterfall in British Columbia
Cascade Falls (Kettle River), a waterfall in British Columbia
Cascade Falls Regional Park, British Columbia

United States
Alphabetical by state
Cascade Falls (Georgia), or Caledonia Cascade, a waterfall in Rabun County, Georgia
Cascade Falls (Ellicott City), a waterfall in Patapsco Valley State Park, Maryland
Cascade Falls (Jackson, Michigan), an artificial waterfall attraction in Cascade Falls Park
Cascade Falls, a waterfall of Montana
Cascade Falls (Falls Creek), a waterfall near Boone, North Carolina
Cascades Waterfall (Craggy Mountains), Buncombe County, North Carolina
Cascade Falls (Lincoln County, Oregon), a waterfall
Cascade Falls (Linn County, Oregon), a waterfall
Cascades Rapids, or Cascade Falls, a defunct rapids along the Columbia River in Oregon and Washington
Cascade Falls, a waterfall in the Cascades conservation area, Giles County, Virginia
Cascade Falls (Falls Creek), a waterfall in Wilkes County, Virginia
Cascade Falls (Osceola), a waterfall in Wisconsin

Fictional
Cascade Falls, Washington, a fictional town in the video game World in Conflict

See also
Cascade Creek (disambiguation)
Cascade River (disambiguation)
Cascade (disambiguation)
Cascades (disambiguation)
Cascadero Falls